Taubach is a river of Thuringia, Germany. At its confluence with the Freibach and the Lengwitz near Stützerbach, the Ilm is formed.

See also
List of rivers of Thuringia

Rivers of Thuringia
Rivers of Germany